Tullyallen is a village, civil parish and townland (of 224 acres) 6 km north-west of the town of Drogheda in County Louth, Ireland. It is in the historic Barony of Ferrard. It is located in the historical Boyne Valley, in the Catholic parish of Mellifont (named after the nearby Mellifont Abbey); it is also close to Newgrange, Knowth and Dowth burial mounds, Monasterboice monastery, and to the Battle of the Boyne site.

Amenities
Amenities within Tullyallen village include a supermarket, church hall, pub, GAA grounds, pharmacy, butcher, hair & beauty salon and fast-food takeaway. Also nearby is Townley Hall and its parkland, including Townley Hall Golf Club. A children's playground, funded by the local community, was opened in October 2011 by the then President of Ireland, Mary McAleese.

The local Roman Catholic church, the Church of the Assumption in Mellifont parish, was built in 1898 and renovated in 2001.

Education
The local primary school, Tullyallen National School, is a co-educational national school which was founded in the 1950s. As of 2016 it had more than 460 pupils enrolled. The school crest depicts the Mellifont lavabo, the Salmon of Knowledge, a quill writing in a book and the Boyne cable bridge.

Sport
Tullyallen's GAA club is known as the Glen Emmets, and comprises football teams ranging from under-7s to seniors. The village also has an association football (soccer) team called Glen Abbey Rovers. Founded in 2009, the Rovers play in division 4 of the Meath And District League, playing their home games on the grounds of Albion Rovers FC, Monasterboice.

Public transport
Bus Éireann route 182 from Ardee to Drogheda via Collon serves Tullyallen several times a day (not Sundays). The nearest train station is Drogheda railway station, approximately 7 kilometres away.

See also 
 List of towns and villages in Ireland

References

External links

Towns and villages in County Louth
Townlands of County Louth